is a 1981 independent Japanese film directed by Seijun Suzuki and based on a novel by Kyōka Izumi. It forms the middle section of Suzuki's Taishō Roman Trilogy, preceded by Zigeunerweisen (1980) and followed by Yumeji (1991), surrealistic psychological dramas and ghost stories linked by style, themes and the Taishō period (1912–1926) setting. All were produced by Genjirō Arato.

Cast
 Yūsaku Matsuda as Shunko Matsuzaki
 Michiyo Okusu as Shinako
 Katsuo Nakamura as Tamawaki
 Yoshio Harada as Wada
 Eriko Kusuda as Ine
 Mariko Kaga as Miyo
 Asao Sano
 Ryūtarō Ōtomo as Shishō

References

External links
 
 
 Kagerō-za  at the Japanese Movie Database

1981 films
1980s Japanese-language films
1981 drama films
Japanese ghost films
Japanese independent films
Films based on Japanese novels
Films directed by Seijun Suzuki
Films set in the Taishō period
1980s Japanese films